Turris hornesi is an extinct species of sea snail, a marine gastropod mollusk in the family Turridae, the turrids.

References

  H. L. Abbass. 1967. A monograph on the Egyptian Paleocene and Eocene gastropods. United Arab Republic, Geological Survey-Geological Museum, Palaeontological Series, Monograph (4)1-154 

hornesi
Gastropods described in 1866